This is a list of Mexican films released in 2007.

2007

References

External links

List of 2007 box office number-one films in Mexico

2007
Films
Mexican